Safe@Office is a line of firewall and VPN appliances developed by SofaWare Technologies, a Check Point company.

The Check Point Safe@Office product line is targeted at the small and medium business segment, and includes the 500 and 500W (with Wi-Fi) series of internet security appliance. The old S-Box, Safe@Home, 100 series, 200 series, and 400W series are discontinued.

The appliances are licensed according to the number of protected IP addresses (referenced to as users) in numbers 5, 25 or unlimited. There is also a variant with a built-in ADSL modem.

See also
 VPN-1 UTM Edge — similar appliance with possibility of being managed from the Check Point SmartCenter.

References

External links
Safe@Office Product Page At The Check Point Website
Safe@Office Product Page At The SofaWare Website
Fixing Your Connection Is Not Private Error In Browser

Computer network security